"The Best Years of Our Lives" is a song by the British rock band Steve Harley & Cockney Rebel, released in 1975 as the title track from the band's third studio album The Best Years of Our Lives. In 1977, a live version of the song was released as a single from the album Face to Face: A Live Recording.

Original studio version

Background
Following the split of the original Cockney Rebel line-up in July 1974, Harley assembled a new line-up later in the year and renamed the band Steve Harley & Cockney Rebel. In November-December 1974, the new band recorded The Best Years of Our Lives album at Abbey Road Studios and Air Studios in London. In 2014, Harley recalled of the song's recording, "We played it live in the studio, all sat round together. There were no overdubs, and we all wanted to get the feel of the song on record."

Speaking to Record & Popswop Mirror in 1974, Harley described "The Best Years of Our Lives" as a "big song" and one which he "sing[s] a lot because it means a lot to me" He added, "I'm considering using [the name] for the album title because the whole album is like it, the whole album is a theme." When the band performed the song live at the Hammersmith Odeon on 14 April 1975, Harley announced it as "the most serious song I've ever wrote in my life". Since then, the song has consistently been a popular inclusion at Harley and the band's concerts, however, the song has undergone multiple arrangement changes over the years (most notably concerning how the song is played during acoustic tours).

In 2014, EMI released a definitive edition of the album as a four CD + DVD box-set. On disc one, a previously unreleased acoustic demo of "The Best Years of Our Lives" was included. In an online diary entry, Harley said of the demo:

Critical reception
Upon release, Record & Popswap Mirror reviewed The Best Years of Our Lives and said: "Each song has a distinct character, culminating in the personal message - the title track." In the liner notes of the 2014 definitive edition, Geoff Barton wrote how the song saw Harley "reprising the hard-bitten troubadour persona he adopted on Cockney Rebel's first two albums", adding that it "somehow manages to be both triumphant and mournful at the same time". Donald A. Guarisco of AllMusic retrospectively highlighted the song as one of the album's "standouts". He described it as "a touching acoustic ballad that highlights some of Harley's most direct and emotional lyrics". Guarisco also selected the song as an AMG pick track.

Personnel
Cockney Rebel
 Steve Harley - vocals, producer
 Jim Cregan - acoustic guitar
 George Ford - bass guitar
 Duncan Mackay - keyboards
 Stuart Elliott - drums

Additional personnel
 Alan Parsons – producer, engineer, mixing
 Gary Edwards – tape operator
 Peter James – tape operator
 Chris Blair – mastering

Face to Face: A Live Recording version

In 1977, a live version of the song was released as the sole single from the band's live album Face to Face: A Live Recording.

Background
Following the release of the band's fifth studio album Love's a Prima Donna in October 1976, the band embarked on an eight-date UK tour in December to promote it. A number of concerts were recorded on the tour, along with the band's one-off charity concert at London Rainbow in February 1977. Harley then selected the best tracks for release on a double live album. A day before its release, the band's split was announced. Face to Face: A Live Recording was released in July 1977 and reached at No. 40 in the UK. To promote the album, a live single was released in August, with "The Best Years of Our Lives" chosen as the A-side, and "Tumbling Down" as the B-side. The single did not enter the UK Top 50.

Release
The single was released by EMI Records on 7" and 12" vinyl in the UK only. It was the band's first single to be released on the 12" vinyl format, which itself was labelled as being limited edition. The single was also the band's first to be released in the UK with a picture sleeve. It featured the same photograph of Harley on stage on both sides of the sleeve.

Track listing
7" Single
"The Best Years of Our Lives" - 5:00
"Tumbling Down" - 6:34

12" Single
"The Best Years of Our Lives" - 5:00
"Tumbling Down" - 6:34

Critical reception
On its release, Sheila Prophet of Record Mirror said: "This one is live and it's a cracker. Just listen to the way he controls the audience - amazing. It's easily the best track on Face to Face and though I don't know how valid it is as a single, it's a worthwhile buy for any hard-up fans who can't afford the fancy double album package." In a review of the live album, Geoff Barton of Sounds stated: "...by contrast, side three and four are magnificent, compulsive. Three opens with "Best Years of Our Lives", always an emotional highspot."

Other live versions
Aside from the version appearing on Face to Face: A Live Recording, other live versions of the song have been included on a number of other releases. On 14 April 1975, Steve Harley & Cockney Rebel performed the song as part of their set at the Hammersmith Odeon, London. The concert was filmed and released as a film titled Between the Lines. In 1989, the band's concert at Brighton, which included the song, was released on the VHS The Come Back, All is Forgiven Tour: Live. Live versions also appeared on 1999's Stripped to the Bare Bones and 2004's Anytime! (A Live Set).

Live versions of the song played post-2015 include an improvisation section after the main lyric section of the song has finished, where Harley gives each musician on stage an opportunity to do a solo, following the tune of the three main verses at first, and then moving into improvisation, normally starting with keyboards, and finishing with electric guitar (under Paul Cuddeford), or melodica and violin, with acoustic guitar after keyboards (under Robbie Gladwell). When played this way, the song often lasts for over 15 minutes, almost 5 times the length of the original song. For example, the October 2021 Edinburgh Queen's Hall concert's order was piano, acoustic guitar, bass guitar, violin, melodica. Whereas the June 2019 show at Holmfirth Picturedrome instead featured piano, violin, melodica, and electric guitar. In both instances, melodica and violin would end up being played together, as a duet. Furthermore, when there are guest musicians on stage, Harley will often invite them to also do a solo on the track.

MonaLisa Twins version
In 2015, the MonaLisa Twins recorded their own version of the song. A music video for their version was uploaded onto YouTube on 4 October 2015. The song was recorded to tie-in with the duo's upcoming involvement in the November 2015 UK tour of Steve Harley & Cockney Rebel, which celebrated the 40th anniversary of the album of the same name. On the tour, the MonaLisa Twins were part of the backing band.

For their version of "The Best Years of Our Lives", the MonaLisa Twins revealed:

References

1975 songs
EMI Records singles
Songs written by Steve Harley
1977 singles
Song recordings produced by Alan Parsons